Patrick Pichette,  is a Canadian business executive and venture capitalist who was the senior vice president and the chief financial officer of Google from 2008 until 2015. He then became a venture capital fund manager, and is a director for several companies and a foundation.

Early life and education 
Pichette was born and raised in Montreal, Quebec. He holds a Bachelor of Business Administration degree from Université du Québec à Montréal (1987) and a Master of Arts degree in philosophy, politics and economics from Pembroke College of the University of Oxford. He received a Rhodes Scholarship.

Career 
Pichette began his career working at McKinsey & Company and Bell Canada from 2001 until 2008.

He was senior vice president and chief financial officer of Google Inc. from 2008 until 2015.

In April 2011, it was announced that Pichette would also be taking over human resources responsibilities within Google from vice president Laszlo Bock, and BizOps from Shona Brown.

In 2013, Pichette accepted a position on the board of directors for Bombardier Inc., a position he held until 2017.

In March 2015, he announced  he would retire to travel the world.
He was succeeded as CFO by Ruth Porat.

In June 2015, he received the National Order of Québec.

In April 2018, he joined Inovia Capital, a venture capital firm with offices in Montreal, Toronto, San Francisco and London. After becoming a general partner at Inovia Capital, Pichette is splitting his time between the firm's offices in London, Canada and Silicon Valley.

In 2019, Pichette became a lead founding member of UK's Creative Destruction Lab at Oxford.

In 2021, Pichette was appointed as a board member of indoor cycling app company Zwift.

Pichette was appointed independent board chair of Twitter on June 2, 2020.  He served as lead independent director from 2018–2022. After Elon Musk's acquisition of Twitter in October 2022, Musk fired the entire board of directors, including Pichette, leaving Musk as the sole board member.

Pichette serves on the Board of Directors as Chair of the Board at Montreal-based company Lightspeed.  He joined in October 2018 and took the position of Lead Independent Chair in February 2022.  He served chair of the board of directors at the Trudeau Foundation from November 2018 until March 2021.  Pichette is a board advisor to the start-up Arctoris.

Personal life 
Pichette lives in London, and is married to Tamar Pichette. 

He and his wife Tamar are involved in philanthropic projects including a conservation and research project with Nature Conservancy Canada in protecting Kenauk, a 65,000 acre territory between Montreal and Ottawa. They are active partners in a project with Himalayan Cataract Project, building an eye hospital in Ethiopia.

References

External links 
 Biography at Inovia

Alumni of Pembroke College, Oxford
Canadian Rhodes Scholars
Google employees
Université du Québec à Montréal alumni
Living people
McKinsey & Company people
Chief financial officers
Knights of the National Order of Quebec
Year of birth missing (living people)
Directors of Twitter, Inc.